The Paraguayan ambassador in Berlin is the official representative of the Government in Asunción to the Government of Germany.

List of representatives

External Links 
 List compiled by Ricardo Scavone Yegros of Paraguayan diplomatic mission personnel, from 1842 to 2011
 Historic list from the Paraguayan Ministry of Foreign Affairs of Paraguayan diplomatic mission personnel

Ambassadors of Paraguay to Germany
Germany
Paraguay